Mohamed Bangura (born 1989) is a Sierra Leonean footballer.

Mohamed Bangura may also refer to:

Mohamed Bangura (boxer) (born 1959), Sierra Leonean former Olympic boxer
Mohamed Bilili Bangura (born 1994), Sierra Leonean footballer
Mohamed Bangura, Sierra Leonean journalist abducted in 1996
Mohamed Bangura, Sierra Leonean Minister of Information in 1998 under the Armed Forces Revolutionary Council

See also
Mohamed Bangoura (disambiguation)